Sweet Pussy Pauline (real name Candice Jordan) is an American vocalist.

She is known for having two top 25 UK hit singles in collaboration with The Candy Girls, a top 10 hit on the US Dance Chart and numerous other underground releases both under this name and the pseudonym Candy J.

Discography

Singles

References

Living people
American women singers
Year of birth missing (living people)
21st-century American women